X-ray emission spectroscopy (XES) is a form of X-ray spectroscopy in which the X-ray line spectra are measured with a spectral resolution sufficient to analyze the impact of the chemical environment on the X-ray line energy and on branching ratios.
This is done by exciting electrons out of their shell and then watching the emitted photons of the recombinating electrons.

There are several types of XES and can be categorized as non-resonant XES (XES), which includes -measurements, valence-to-core (VtC/V2C)-measurements, and -measurements, or as resonant XES (RXES or RIXS), which includes XXAS+XES 2D-measurement, high-resolution XAS, 2p3d RIXS, and Mössbauer-XES-combined measurements. In addition, Soft X-ray emission spectroscopy (SXES) is used in determining the electronic structure of materials.

History 
The first XES experiments were published by Lindh and Lundquist in 1924 
In these early studies, the authors utilized the electron beam of an X-ray tube to excite core electrons and obtain the -line spectra of sulfur and other elements. Three years later, Coster and Druyvesteyn performed the first experiments using photon excitation. Their work demonstrated that the electron beams produce artifacts, thus motivating the use of X-ray photons for creating the core hole. Subsequent experiments were carried out with commercial X-ray spectrometers, as well as with high-resolution spectrometers.

While these early studies provided fundamental insights into the electronic configuration of small molecules, XES only came into broader use with the availability of high intensity X-ray beams at synchrotron radiation facilities, which enabled the measurement of (chemically) dilute samples.
In addition to the experimental advances, it is also the progress in quantum chemical computations, which makes XES an intriguing tool for the study of the electronic structure of chemical compounds.

Henry Moseley, a British physicist was the first to discover a relation between the -lines and the atomic numbers of the probed elements. This was the birth hour of modern x-ray spectroscopy.
Later these lines could be used in elemental analysis to determine the contents of a sample.

William Lawrence Bragg later found a relation between the energy of a photon and its diffraction within a crystal. The formula he established,  says that an X-ray photon with a certain energy bends at a precisely defined angle within a crystal.

Equipment

Analyzers
A special kind of monochromator is needed to diffract the radiation produced in X-Ray-Sources. This is because X-rays have a refractive index n ≈ 1. Bragg came up with the equation that describes x-ray/neutron diffraction when those particles pass a crystal lattice.(X-ray diffraction)

For this purpose "perfect crystals" have been produced in many shapes, depending on the geometry and energy range of the instrument. Although they are called perfect, there are miscuts within the crystal structure which leads to offsets of the Rowland plane.
These offsets can be corrected by turning the crystal while looking at a specific energy(for example: -line of copper at 8027.83eV).
When the intensity of the signal is maximized, the photons diffracted by the crystal hit the detector in the Rowland plane.
There will now be a slight offset in the horizontal plane of the instrument which can be corrected by increasing or decreasing the detector angle.

In the Von Hamos geometry, a cylindrically bent crystal disperses the radiation along its flat surface's plane and focuses it along its axis of curvature onto a line like feature. 
The spatially distributed signal is recorded with a position sensitive detector at the crystal's focusing axis providing the overall spectrum.
Alternative wavelength dispersive concepts have been proposed and implemented based on Johansson geometry having the source positioned inside
the Rowland circle, whereas an instrument based on Johann geometry has its source placed on the Rowland circle.

X-ray sources
X-ray sources are produced for many different purposes, yet not every X-ray source can be used for spectroscopy. Commonly used sources for medical applications generally generate very "noisy" source spectra, because the used cathode material must not be very pure for these measurements. These lines must be eliminated as much as possible to get a good resolution in all used energy ranges.

For this purpose normal X-ray tubes with highly pure tungsten, molybdenum, palladium, etc. are made. Except for the copper they are embedded in, the produce a relatively "white" spectrum.
Another way of producing X-rays are particle accelerators. The way they produce X-rays is from vectorial changes of their direction through magnetic fields. Every time a moving charge changes direction it has to give off radiation of corresponding energy. In X-ray tubes this directional change is the electron hitting the metal target (Anode) in synchrotrons it is the outer magnetic field accelerating the electron into a circular path.

There are many different kind of X-ray tubes and operators have to choose accurately depending on what it is, that should be measured.

Modern spectroscopy and the importance of -lines in the 21st Century
Today, XES is less used for elemental analysis, but more and more do measurements of -line spectra find importance,
as the relation between these lines and the electronic structure of the ionized atom becomes more detailed.

If an 1s-Core-Electron gets excited into the continuum(out of the atoms energy levels in MO),
electrons of higher energy orbitals need to lose energy and "fall" to the 1s-Hole that was created to fulfill Hund's Rule.(Fig.2) 
Those electron transfers happen with distinct probabilities. (See Siegbahn notation)

Scientists noted that after an ionisation of a somehow bonded 3d-transition metal-atom the -lines intensities and energies shift
with oxidation state of the metal and with the species of ligand(s). This gave way to a new method in structural analysis:

By high-resolution scans of these lines the exact energy level and structural configuration of a chemical compound can be determined. 
This is because there are only two major electron transfer mechanisms, if we ignore every transfer not affecting valence electrons. 
If we include the fact that chemical compounds of 3d-transition metals can either be high-spin or low-spin we get 2 mechanisms for each spin configuration.

Although this is quite a lot of information, this data has to be combined with absorption measurements of the so-called "pre-edge" region. 
Those measurements are called XANES (X-ray absorption near edge structure).

In synchrotron facilities those measurement can be done at the same time,
yet the experiment setup is quite complex and needs exact and fine tuned crystal monochromators to diffract the tangential beam coming from the electron storage ring.
Method is called HERFD, which stands for High Energy Resolution Fluorescence Detection.
The collection method is unique in that, after a collection of all wavelengths coming from "the source" called ,
the beam is then shone onto the sampleholder with a detector behind it for the XANES part of the measurement.
The sample itself starts to emit X-rays and after those photons have been monochromatized they are collected, too. 
Most setups use at least three crystal monochromators or more.
The  is used in absorption measurements as a part of the Beer-Lambert Law in the equation

where  is the intensity of transmitted photons.
The received values for the extinction  are wavelength specific which therefore creates a spectrum of the absorption. 
The spectrum produced from the combined data shows clear advantage in that background radiation is almost completely eliminated while still having an extremely resoluted view on features on a given absorption edge.(Fig.4)

In the field of development of new catalysts for more efficient energy storage, production and usage in form of hydrogen fuelcells and new battery materials,
the research of the -lines is essential nowadays.

The exact shape of specific oxidation states of metals is mostly known, yet newly produced chemical compounds with the potential 
of becoming a reasonable catalyst for electrolysis, for example, are measured every day.

Several countries encourage many different facilities all over the globe in this special field of science in the hope for clean, responsible and cheap energy.

Soft x-ray emission spectroscopy

Soft X-ray emission spectroscopy or (SXES) is an experimental technique for determining the electronic structure of materials.

Uses
X-ray emission spectroscopy (XES) provides a means of probing the partial occupied density of electronic states of a material. XES is element-specific and site-specific, making it a powerful tool for determining detailed electronic properties of materials.

Forms
Emission spectroscopy can take the form of either resonant inelastic X-ray emission spectroscopy (RIXS) or non-resonant X-ray emission spectroscopy (NXES). Both spectroscopies involve the photonic promotion of a core level electron, and the measurement of the fluorescence that occurs as the electron relaxes into a lower-energy state. The differences between resonant and non-resonant excitation arise from the state of the atom before fluorescence occurs.

In resonant excitation, the core electron is promoted to a bound state in the conduction band. Non-resonant excitation occurs when the incoming radiation promotes a core electron to the continuum. When a core hole is created in this way, it is possible for it to be refilled through one of several different decay paths. Because the core hole is refilled from the sample's high-energy free states, the decay and emission processes must be treated as separate dipole transitions. This is in contrast with RIXS, where the events are coupled, and must be treated as a single scattering process.

Properties
Soft X-rays have different optical properties than visible light and therefore experiments must take place in ultra high vacuum, where the photon beam is manipulated using special mirrors and diffraction gratings.

Gratings diffract each energy or wavelength present in the incoming radiation in a different direction. Grating monochromators allow the user to select the specific photon energy they wish to use to excite the sample. Diffraction gratings are also used in the spectrometer to analyze the photon energy of the radiation emitted by the sample.

See also
 X-ray absorption spectroscopy

References

External links
 Soft X-ray Emission Spectroscopy - Description at beamteam.usask.ca

Emission spectroscopy
X-rays
X-ray spectroscopy